
Gmina Mogielnica is an urban-rural gmina (administrative district) in Grójec County, Masovian Voivodeship, in east-central Poland.

Villages
Apart from the town of Mogielnica, Gmina Mogielnica contains the villages and settlements of Borowe, Brzostowiec, Cegielnia, Dąbrowa, Dalboszek, Dębnowola, Dobiecin, Dylew, Dziarnów, Dziunin, Główczyn, Główczyn-Towarzystwo, Górki-Izabelin, Gracjanów, Jastrzębia, Jastrzębia Stara, Kaplin, Kozietuły, Kozietuły Nowe, Ługowice, Marysin, Michałowice, Miechowice, Odcinki Dylewskie, Otaląż, Otalążka, Pączew, Pawłowice, Popowice, Ślepowola, Stamirowice, Stryków, Świdno, Tomczyce, Ulaski Gostomskie, Wężowiec, Wodziczna and Wólka Gostomska.

Neighbouring gminas
Gmina Mogielnica is bordered by the gminas of Belsk Duży, Błędów, Goszczyn, Nowe Miasto nad Pilicą, Promna, Sadkowice and Wyśmierzyce.

References
Polish official population figures 2006

Mogielnica
Grójec County